This is a list of Iranian football transfers for the 2016–17 winter transfer window. Transfers of Iran Pro League is listed. 
Transfer window will open on 5 January 2017 and close on 2 February 2017.

Players limits

The Iranian Football Clubs who participate in 2016–17 Iranian football different leagues are allowed to have up to maximum 35 players in their player lists, which will be categorized in the following groups:
 Up to maximum 18 adult (without any age limit) players
 Up to maximum 9 under-23 players (i.e. the player whose birth is after 1 January 1994).
 Up to maximum 8 under-21 players (i.e. the player whose birth is after 1 January 1996).

Iran Pro League

Rules and regulations 
According to Iran Football Federation rules for 2016–17 Persian Gulf Pro League, each Football Club is allowed to take up to maximum 6 new Iranian player from the other clubs who already played in the 2015–16 Iran Pro League season. In addition to these six new players, each club is allowed to take up to maximum 4 non-Iranian new players (at least one of them should be Asian) and up to 3 players from Free agent (who did not play in 2015–16 Iran Pro League season or doesn't list in any 2015–16 League after season's start) during the season. In addition to these players, the clubs are also able to take some new under-23 and under-21 years old players, if they have some free place in these categories in their player lists. Under-23 players should sign in transfer window but under-21 can be signed during the first mid-season.

Esteghlal 
Head coach:  Alireza Mansourian

In:

Out:

Esteghlal Khuzestan 
Head coach:  Sirous Pourmousavi

In:

Out:

Foolad 
Head coach:  Naeim Saadavi

In:

Out:

FC Mashhad 
Head coach:  Khodadad Azizi (interim)

In:

Out:

Gostaresh Foulad 
Head coach:  Faraz Kamalvand

In:

Out:

Machine Sazi 
Head coach:  

In:

Out:

Naft Tehran 
Head coach:  Ali Daei

In:

Out:

Padideh 
Head coach:  Mohammad Reza Mohajeri

In:

Out:

Paykan 
Head coach:  Majid Jalali

In:

Out:

Persepolis 
Head coach:  Branko Ivanković

In:

Out:

Saba Qom 
Head coach:  Samad Marfavi

In:

Out:

Saipa 
Head coach:  Hossein Faraki

In:

Out:

Sanat Naft Abadan 
Head coach:  Firouz Karimi

In:

Out:

Sepahan 
Head coach:  Abdollah Veisi

In:

Out:

Tractor Sazi 
Head coach:  Amir Ghalenoei 

In:

Out:

Zob Ahan 
Head coach:  Mojtaba Hosseini

In:

Out:

Notes
PL Pro League quota.

Notes and references

Football transfers winter 2016–17
2016
Transfers